Alternatino with Arturo Castro is an American sketch comedy television series, created by and starring Arturo Castro, which premiered on June 18, 2019 on Comedy Central. The series is executive produced by Castro, Jay Martel, Nick Jasenovec, Sam Saife, David Martin, Jon Thoday, and Richard Allen-Turner. Jasenovec directed the whole first season as well.

The series was renewed for a second season and would have moved to Quibi, but as the service shut down in December 2020, the status of the show is unknown.

Premise
Alternatino with Arturo Castro is described as "a sketch show based on Arturo's experiences as a Latino millennial in the United States."

Production

Development
On April 17, 2018, it was announced that Comedy Central had given the production a series order. The series was created by and set to star Arturo Castro who will also executive produce alongside Nick Jasenovec, Sam Saife, David Martin, Jon Thoday, and Richard Allen-Turner. Jasenovec is also expected to act as director for the series. Production companies involved with the series include Avalon Television.

On June 26, 2018, it was reported that Jay Martel had been hired as a showrunner and executive producer for the series.

On April 18, 2019, it was announced that the series would premiere on June 18, 2019.

Filming
Principal photography for the series had reportedly commenced by December 11, 2018, in New York City, New York.

Episodes

References

External links

English-language television shows
Comedy Central original programming
Quibi original programming
2010s American variety television series
2010s American sketch comedy television series
2019 American television series debuts
Hispanic and Latino American television